Hurstville was an electoral district of the Legislative Assembly in the Australian state of New South Wales, named after and including the Sydney suburb of Hurstville.

It was first established prior to the 1913 state election. It was abolished in 1920, with the introduction of proportional representation and absorbed into St George. It was recreated in 1927 and dissolved in a distribution prior to the 1999 state election. Between 1991 and 1999 it was held by Morris Iemma who went on to become Premier of New South Wales in August 2005.

Members for Hurstville

Election results

References

Former electoral districts of New South Wales
1913 establishments in Australia
Constituencies established in 1913
1920 disestablishments in Australia
Constituencies disestablished in 1920
1927 establishments in Australia
Constituencies established in 1927
1999 disestablishments in Australia
Constituencies disestablished in 1999